Larisa Ivanovna Golubkina (born 9 March 1940, in Moscow, Soviet Union) is a Russian actress.

She entered the Moscow Musical School in 1955, graduating after four years, and then enrolled into the Lunacharsky State Institute for Theatre Arts. During her studies, she made her screen debut in the 1962 comedy Hussar Ballad, in the role of Shurochka Azarova. Golubkina matriculated in 1964, becoming a regular actor in the Russian Army Theatre. She appeared in some twenty movies and in numerous theater productions. In 1991, she was declared a People's Artist of the Russian SFSR, and in 2000 was awarded the Order of Friendship. She also received the Order of the Badge of Honor twice.

Golubkina was the second wife of the late Andrei Mironov. Her daughter is the actress Maria Golubkina.

Selected filmography
Hussar Ballad (1962)
Give Me a Book of Complaints (1965)
The Tale of Tsar Saltan (1966)
Liberation (1971)
Three Men in a Boat (1979)

References

1940 births
Living people
Soviet film actresses
Soviet stage actresses
Russian film actresses
People's Artists of the RSFSR
20th-century Russian women